The labour movement or labor movement consists of two main wings: the trade union movement (British English) or labor union movement (American English) on the one hand, and the political labour movement on the other.

 The trade union movement (trade unionism) consists of the collective organisation of working people developed to represent and campaign for better working conditions and treatment from their employers and, by the implementation of labour and employment laws, from their governments. The standard unit of organisation is the trade union.

 The political labour movement in many countries includes a political party that represents the interests of employees, often known as a "labour party" or "workers' party". Many individuals and political groups otherwise considered to represent ruling classes may be part of, and active in, the labour movement.

The labour movement developed as a response to the industrial capitalism of the late 18th and early 19th centuries, at about the same time as socialism.

History

Origins of the Labour movement
The labour movement has its origins in Europe during the Industrial Revolution of the late 18th and early 19th centuries, when agricultural and cottage industry jobs disappeared and were replaced as mechanization and industrialization moved employment to more industrial areas like factory towns causing an influx of low-skilled labour and a concomitant decline in real wages and living standards for workers in urban areas. Prior to the industrial revolution, economies in Europe were dominated by the guild system which had originated in the Middle Ages.  The guilds were expected to protect the interests of the owners, labourers, and consumers through regulation of wages, prices, and standard business practices. However, as the increasingly unequal and oligarchic guild system deteriorated in the 16th and 17th centuries, spontaneous formations of journeymen within the guilds would occasionally act together to demand better wage rates and conditions, and these ad hoc groupings can be considered the forerunners of the modern labour movement. These formations were succeeded by trade unions forming in Britain in the 18th century. Nevertheless, without the continuous technological and international trade pressures during the Industrial Revolution, these trade unions remained sporadic and localised only to certain regions and professions, and there was not yet enough impetus for the formation of a widespread and comprehensive labour movement. Therefore the labour movement is usually marked as beginning concurrently with the Industrial Revolution in the United Kingdom, roughly around 1760-1830.

16th and 17th centuries

In England the guild system was usurped in its regulation of wages by parliament in the 16th century with the passage of the Elizabethan Era apprentice laws such as the 1562 Statute of Artificers which placed the power to regulate wages and employment in the hands of local officials in each parish. Parliament had been responding to petitions made by English weavers in 1555 who asserted that the owners were "giving much less wages and hire for weaving of clothes than they did in the past." This legislation was intended to ensure just compensation for workers throughout the country so they could maintain a "competent livelihood". This doctrine of parliamentary involvement remained in place until about 1700 at which point the practice of wage regulation began to decline, and in 1757 parliament outright rescinded the Weavers Act of 1756, abandoning its power of wage regulation and signaling its newfound dedication to laissez-faire economics. Consequently, from 1760 on, real wages began to fall and food prices began to rise giving increased motivation for political and social agitation.  As the guild system became increasingly obsolete and parliament abolished the old medieval labour protections, forswearing responsibility for maintaining living standards, the workers began to form the earliest versions of trade unions. The workers on the lowest rungs found it necessary to organise in new ways to protect their wages and other interests such as living standards and working conditions. The idea met with great resistance.

18th century
There is no record of enduring trade unions existing prior to the 18th century. Beginning from 1700 onward there are records of complaints in the United Kingdom, which increase through the century, that show instances of labourers "combining" together to raise wages had become a phenomenon in various regions and professions. These early trade unions were fairly small and limited in scope, and were separated from unions in other geographical areas or unions in other professions. The unions would strike, collectively bargain with employers, and, if that did not suffice, petition parliament for the enforcement of the Elizabethan statues. The first groups in England to practice early trade unionism were the West of England wool workers and the framework knitters in the Midlands. As early as 1718 a royal proclamation was given in opposition to the formation of any unsanctioned bodies of journeymen attempting to affect wages and employment. In 1721 the master tailors of London sent complaints to parliament claiming that their journeymen were illicitly combining to raise wage, actions which seemed to inspire other London tradesmen to combine as well. Despite the presumption that unionising was illegal, it continued throughout the 18th century.   

In Norwich there were strikes and riots by miners in 1710, 1744, 1750, 1765, 1771, and 1794.  In Nottingham there were strikes by framework knitters in 1783, 1787, and 1791. These strikers usually resorted to machine breaking and sabotage in order to win strikes as quickly as possible. In 1751 wool-combers in Leicestershire formed a union which both disallowed hiring non-members and provided aid for out-of-work members. In the Spitalfields area of London, weavers went on strike and rioted in 1765, 1769, and 1773 until parliament relented and allowed justices in the area to fix wage rates. Artisans and workers would also create small craft clubs or trade clubs in each town or locality and these groups such as the hatters in London, shipwrights in Liverpool, or cutlers in Sheffield could use their clubs to unionize. Workers could also use the ubiquitous friendly societies, which had increasingly cropped up British society since 1700, as cover for union activities.  

In politics, the MP John Wilkes used mass appeal to workers through public meetings, pamphleteering, and the popular press, in order to gain their support as he advocated for an increase in the voting franchise, popular rights, and an end to corruption.  When he was imprisoned for criticizing King George III, his followers protested and were fired upon by the government at the Massacre of St George's Fields in 1768, which resulted in a round of strikes and riots throughout England. Wilkes headed the loose group of Radicals within parliament and his supporters formed the Society of the Bill of Rights in 1769. Wilkes enjoyed some level of popularity with the masses in London until his career was destroyed by the Gordon Riots of 1780. Other notable radicals at the time included Dr. John Jebb, Major Cartwright, and John Horne. 

With the advent of the French Revolution, radicalism became even more prominent in English politics with the publication of Thomas Paine's The Rights of Man in 1791 and the foundation of the working-class focused London Corresponding Society in 1792. Membership in the society increased rapidly and by the end of the year it may have had as many as three thousand chapters in Britain. Working class radicalism spread so quickly in Britain that the government, fearful of this new English Jacobinism, responded with widescale political repression spearheaded by prime minister Pitt the Younger. Paine was forced to flee the country after his work was deemed to be seditious, booksellers selling Paine's or other radical works were arrested, the Scottish reformers Thomas Muir, Rev. Thomas Fyshe Palmer, Joseph Gerrald, and Maurice Margarot were transported, and in 1794 the leadership of the L.C.S was arrested and tried. Speech and public gatherings were tightly restricted by the Two Acts of 1795 which made certain words acts of treason, limited public gatherings to fifty people or fewer, and enforced licensing for anyone who wanted to speak in a public debate or lecture hall. In 1797 the L.C.S was outlawed by parliament along with the United Irishmen, the United Scotsmen, and the United Britons, groups which had been advocating for the equal political representation of all men within the British Isles. With these acts the political factions of the labour movement in Britain had been effectively crushed. Additionally, forming unions or combinations was made illegal under legislation such as the 1799 Combination Act. Despite this setback, trade unionism in Britain continued into the 19th century albeit illegally and under increasing hardship. According to Gravener Henson, a labour leader from Nottingham, the Combination Acts were:
 Still, determined workers refused allow the law to entirely eradicate trade unionism, and in the face of collective bargaining some employers chose to forgo legal prosecution and instead cooperated with workers' demands.

19th century
The Scottish weavers of Glasgow went on strike around 1805, demanding enforcement of the old Elizabethan laws empowering magistrates to fix wages to meet the costs of living, however after three weeks the strike was ended when the police arrested the strike leaders. A renewed stimulus to organised labour in the United Kingdom can be traced back to 1808 with the failure of the 'Minimum Wage Bill' in parliament which supporters had seen as a needed countermeasure for the endemic poverty among the working classes of industrial Britain. After the failure of the Minimum Wage Bill displayed the British government's commitment to laissez-faire policy, labourers began to express their discontent in the form of the first large scale strikes in the new factory districts. Within days over 15,000 weavers would begin striking in Manchester resulting in one dead striker and mass vandalism of machinery. Agitation was not ended until it was agreed that weavers would receive a 20% increase in wages. In 1813 and 1814 parliament would finally repeal the last of Elizabethan Era laws known as the apprentice laws which had been intended to protect wage rates and employment, but which had also fallen into serious disuse many decades before. 

The United Kingdom saw an increasing number of large-scale strikes, mainly in the north. First in 1810 among the miners in Northumberland and Durham called a general strike, and later, in 1812, a general strike among weavers was called in Scotland after employers refused to institute wage scales. These strikes in the far north of Britain failed due to suppression by the police and the military. In 1811 in Nottinghamshire, a new movement known as the Luddite, or machine-breaker movement, began. In response to declining living standards, workers all over the English Midlands started to sabotage and destroy the machinery used in textile production such as stocking frames.  As the industry was still decentralized at the time and the movement was secretive, none of the leadership was ever caught and employers in the Midlands textile industry were forced to raise wages.

In 1812 the first radical, socialist, pro-labor society, the 'Society of Spencean Philanthropists', named after the radical social agitator Thomas Spence, was formed. Spence, a pamphleteer in London since 1776, believed in the socialized distribution of land and changing England into a federalized government based on democratically elected parish communes. The society was small and had only a limited presence in English politics, and even before Spence's death in 1814 other leaders such Henry Hunt, William Cobbet, and Lord Cochrane, known as Radicals, rose to the head of the labor movement demanding the lowering of taxes, the abolition of pensions and sinecures, and an end to payments of the war debt.  This radicalism only increased in the aftermath of the end of the Napoleonic Wars as a general economic downturn in 1815 led to a revival in pro-labour politics. During this time half of each worker's wages was taxed away, unemployment greatly increased, and food prices would not drop from their war time highs. 

After the passage of the Corn Laws which prohibited the importation of cheap grains, to the benefit of the landed elite and detriment of the workers, there was mass rioting throughout Britain. Many working class papers started being published and received by a wide audience. These included Cobbet's "Weekly Political Register, Thomas Wooler's The Black Dwarf, and William Hone's Reformists's Register. In addition, new political clubs focused on reform, called Hampden Clubs, were formed after a model suggested by Major Cartwright. In 1816 Henry Hunt gave a speech to a mass audience in London, dealing with issues such as universal suffrage and the Corn Laws.  During his speech a group of Spenceans initiated a series of riots, later known as the Spa Fields riots during which rioters raided gunsmith shops and attempted to overtake the Tower of London.  This outbreak of lawlessness led to a government crackdown on agitation in 1817 known as the Gagging Acts, which included the suppression of the Spencean society, a suspension of habeas corpus, and an extension of power to magistrates which gave them the ability to ban public gatherings. In protest of the Gagging Acts, as well as the poor working conditions in the textile industry, workers in Manchester attempted to march on London to deliver petitions in a demonstration known as the Blanketeers march. The Blanketeers, named after the blankets they brought to sleep on the roadside during their journey, were however intercepted, with most participants either arrested or chased off by the British military. 

From this point onward the British government also began using hired spies and agent provocateurs to disrupt the labour movement, entrap radicals, and orchestrate violent incidents that would turn public opinion against the workers. The most infamous early case of government anti-labour espionage was that of Oliver the Spy who, in 1817, incited and encouraged an armed uprising in Derbyshire, known as the Pentrich Rising, which led to the leadership being indicted on treason charges and executed. A similar incident was concocted by the government spy George Edwards in 1820, wherein he convinced various Spenceans to agree to participate in the Cato Street Conspiracy, a supposed plan to murder the current members of the British cabinet.

In spite of government suppression, the labour movement in Britain continued, and 1818 marked a new round of strikes as well as the first attempt at establishing a single national union that encompassed all trades, led by John Gast and named the "Philanthropic Hercules". Although this enterprise quickly folded, pro-labour political agitation and demonstrations increased in popularity throughout industrial Britain culminating in 1819 with an incident in St. Peter's field, Manchester, known as the Peterloo Massacre. During this event the mounted units of the Manchester and Salford Yeomanry and 15th Hussars attacked the attendees of a crowd composed of about 80,000 people that had gathered to legally demonstrate support of the political reformers and listen to a speech by Henry Hunt.  The attack resulted in 18 deaths and up to 500 injuries, all suffered on the part of the demonstrators. The British government responded with another round of draconian measures aimed at putting down the labour movement, known as the Six Acts.

In 1819 the social reformer Francis Place initiated a reform movement aimed at lobbying parliament into abolishing the anti-union Combination Acts. Unions were legalised in the Combination Acts of 1824 and 1825, however some union actions, such as anti-scab activities were restricted. In 1834 the Tolpuddle Martyrs of Dorset were punished for swearing secret oaths and transported.  

Chartism was possibly the first mass working-class labour movement in the world, originating in England during the mid-19th century between 1838 and 1848. It takes its name from the People's Charter of 1838, which stipulated the six main aims of the movement as:

Suffrage for all men age 21 and over
Voting by secret ballot
Equal-sized constituencies
Pay for Members of Parliament
An end to the need for a property qualification for Parliament
Annual election of Parliament

Eventually, after Chartism died out, Britain adopted the first five reforms. The Chartist movement had a lasting impact in the development of the political labour movement.

The International Workingmen's Association, the first attempt at international coordination, was founded in London in 1864. The major issues included the right of the workers to organize themselves, and the right to an 8-hour working day. In 1871 workers in France rebelled and the Paris Commune was formed. From the mid-19th century onward the labour movement became increasingly globalised.

The movement gained major impetus during the late 19th and early 20th centuries from the Catholic Social Teaching tradition which began in 1891 with the publication of Pope Leo XIII's foundational document, Rerum novarum, also known as "On the Condition of the Working Classes," in which he advocated a series of reforms including limits on the length of the work day, a living wage, the elimination of child labour, the rights of labour to organise, and the duty of the state to regulate labour conditions.

In Britain, the term "new unionism" was used in the 1880s to describe an innovative form of trade unionism. The new unions were generally less exclusive than craft unions and attempted to recruit a wide range of workers. They recruited unskilled and semi-skilled workers, such as dockers, seamen, gasworkers and general labourers. To encourage more workers to join, these new unions kept their entrance fees and contributions at a relatively low level. Some new unions, such as the Dockers' Union and the Gasworkers developed in the direction of general unionism.

Throughout the world, action by labourists has resulted in reforms and workers' rights, such as the two-day weekend, minimum wage, paid holidays, and the achievement of the eight-hour day for many workers. There have been many important labour activists in modern history who have caused changes that were revolutionary at the time and are now regarded as basic. For example, Mary Harris Jones, better known as "Mother Jones", and the National Catholic Welfare Council were important in the campaign to end child labour in the United States during the early 20th century.

Labour parties

Modern labour parties originated from an increase in organising activities in Europe and European colonies during the 19th century, such as the Chartist movement in the United Kingdom during 1838–48.

In 1891, localised labour parties were formed, by trade union members in British colonies in Australasia. In 1899, the Labour Party for the Colony of Queensland briefly formed the world's first labour government, lasting one week. From 1901, when six colonies federated to form the Commonwealth of Australia, several labour parties amalgamated to form the Australian Labor Party (ALP). 

The British Labour Party was created as the Labour Representation Committee, following an 1899 resolution by the Trade Union Congress.

While archetypal labour parties are made of direct union representatives, in addition to members of geographical branches, some union federations or individual unions have chosen not to be represented within a labour party and/or have ended association with them.

Labour festivals

Labour festivals have long been a part of the labour movement. Often held outdoors in the summer, the music, talks, food, drink, and film have attracted hundreds of thousands of attendees each year. Labour festival is a yearly feast of all the unionism gathering, to celebrate the fulfillment of their goals, to bring solutions to certain hindrances and to reform unjust actions of their employers or government.

Labour and racial equality

A degree of strategic biracial cooperation existed among black and white dockworkers on the waterfronts of New Orleans, Louisiana during the early 20th century. Although the groups maintained racially separate labour unions, they coordinated efforts to present a united front when making demands of their employers. These pledges included a commitment to the "50-50" or "half-and-half" system wherein a dock crew would consist of 50% black and 50% white workers and agreement on a single wage demand to reduce the risk of ship owners pitting one race against the other.  Black and white dockworkers also cooperated during protracted labour strikes, including the general levee strikes in 1892 and 1907 as well as smaller strikes involving skilled workers such as screwmen in the early 1900s.

Development of labour movements within nation states 

Historically labour markets have often been constrained by national borders that have restricted movement of workers. Labour laws are also primarily determined by individual nations or states within those nations. While there have been some efforts to adopt a set of international labour standards through the International Labour Organisation (ILO), international sanctions for failing to meet such standards are very limited. In many countries labour movements have developed independently and represent those national boundaries.

Development of an international labour movement 

With ever-increasing levels of international trade and increasing influence of multinational corporations, there has been debate and action among labourists to attempt international co-operation. This has resulted in renewed efforts to organize and collectively bargain internationally. A number of international union organisations have been established in an attempt to facilitate international collective bargaining, to share information and resources and to advance the interests of workers generally.

List of national labour movements 

Trade unions in Albania
Trade unions in Algeria
Trade unions in Andorra
Trade unions in Angola
Trade unions in Antigua and Barbuda
Trade unions in Argentina
Trade unions in Armenia
Australian labour movement
Trade unions in Benin
Trade unions in Botswana
Trade unions in Burkina Faso
Trade unions in Egypt
Trade unions in Ethiopia
Trade unions in Germany
Trade unions in Ghana
Trade unions in India
Iraqi Federation of Trade Unions
Trade unions in Ireland
Labour unions in Japan
Trade unions in Malaysia
Trade unions in Maldives
Trade unions in Nauru
Trade unions in Niger
Trade unions in Oman
Trade unions in Pakistan
Trade unions in Qatar
Trade unions in Senegal
Trade unions in South Africa
Trade unions in Spain
Swedish labour movement
Trade unions in Switzerland
Labour movement in Taiwan
Trade unions in Tanzania
Trade unions in the United Kingdom
Labor unions in the United States

See also

Notes

References

Further reading 

 Geary, Dick. "Socialism, Revolution and the European Labour Movement, 1848-1918." Historical Journal 15, no. 4 (1972): 794–803. online.
Robert N. Stern, Daniel B. Cornfield, The U.S. labor movement:References and Resources, G.K. Hall & Co 1996
John Hinshaw and Paul LeBlanc (ed.), U.S. labor in the twentieth century: studies in working-class struggles and insurgency, Amherst, NY: Humanity Books, 2000

Philip Yale Nicholson, Labor's story in the United States, Philadelphia, Pa.: Temple Univ. Press 2004 (Series ‘Labor in Crisis’), 
 Beverly Silver: Forces of Labor. Worker's Movements and Globalization since 1870, Cambridge University Press, 2003, 
St. James Press Encyclopedia of Labor History Worldwide, St. James Press 2003 
Lenny Flank (ed), IWW: A Documentary History, Red and Black Publishers, St Petersburg, Florida, 2007. 
 Tom Zaniello: Working Stiffs, Union Maids, Reds, and Riffraff: An Expanded Guide to Films about Labor (ILR Press books), Cornell University Press, revised and expanded edition 2003, 
 Neither Washington Nor Stowe: Common Sense For The Working Vermonter, The Green Mountain Anarchist Collective, Catamount Tavern Press, 2004.

External links

The Canadian Museum of Civilization - Canadian Labour History, 1850–1999
LabourStart: Trade union web portal
LaborNet: Global online communication for a democratic, independent labour movement
CEC: A Labour Resource Centre in India